WQXY (1560 AM) was a radio station broadcasting an oldies format. Licensed to Hazard, Kentucky, United States, the station was owned by Black Gold Broadcasting and featured programming from CNN Radio and Jones Radio Network.

History
The station went on the air as WYZQ on March 5, 1987. On October 10, 1990, the station changed its call sign to WQXY.

On September 30, 2015, the Federal Communications Commission (FCC) informed WQXY's owners that it intended to cancel the station's license due to WQXY having been silent since August 1, 2014. In response, Black Gold Broadcasting surrendered the license to the FCC on October 7, 2015.

References

External links

QXY
Radio stations established in 1987
1987 establishments in Kentucky
Defunct radio stations in the United States
Radio stations disestablished in 2015
2015 disestablishments in Kentucky
QXY
QXY
Hazard, Kentucky